United Nations Security Council resolution 1568, adopted unanimously on 22 October 2004, after reaffirming all resolutions on the situation in Cyprus, particularly Resolution 1251 (1999), the council extended the mandate of the United Nations Peacekeeping Force in Cyprus (UNFICYP) for an additional period until 15 June 2005.

The security council called on both Cyprus and Northern Cyprus to urgently address the humanitarian issue of missing persons. It welcomed the Secretary-General Kofi Annan's review of UNFICYP as requested in Resolution 1548 (2004) and his assessment that violence on the island was increasingly unlikely. The Secretary-General would conduct a further review of the United Nations operation in Cyprus based on developments on the ground and the views of the parties concerned.

Extending UNFICYP's mandate, the resolution requested the Secretary-General to report to the council on the implementation of the current resolution, further endorsing his amendments to the concept of operations and force level of UNFICYP by reducing troop levels and slightly increasing the number of police. It urged the Turkish Cypriot side to restore the military status quo at Strovilia prior to 30 June 2000 and called for an end to restrictions imposed on UNFICYP operations.

See also
 Annan Plan
 Annan Plan referendum
 Cyprus dispute
 List of United Nations Security Council Resolutions 1501 to 1600 (2003–2005)
 United Nations Buffer Zone in Cyprus
 Turkish invasion of Cyprus

References

External links
 
Text of the Resolution at undocs.org

 1568
 1568
2004 in Cyprus
2000s in Cypriot politics
October 2004 events